Kim Dong-young is a Korean name consisting of the family name Kim and the given name Dong-young, and may also refer to:

 Kim Dong-young (racewalker) (born 1980), South Korean athlete
 Kim Dong-young (actor) (born 1988), South Korean actor
 Kim Dong-young (singer) (born 1996), South Korean singer